Andreas Seppi was the defending champion, but he lost in the quarterfinals to Robin Haase.
Robin Haase won the title, defeating Albert Montañés 6–4, 4–6, 6–1 in the final.

This was the first ATP tournament main draw appearance for future US Open champion and world No. 3 Dominic Thiem.

Seeds
The first four seeds received a bye into the second round.

Qualifying

Draw

Finals

Top half

Bottom half

References
 Main Draw
 Qualifying Draw

Bet-at-Home Cup - Singles
Austrian Open Kitzbühel